Invasion of the Blood Farmers is a 1972 horror film directed by Ed Adlum and written by Adlum and Ed Kelleher.

Plot
The film centers around a group of druids called the "Sangroids" living in Westchester County, New York, who plan to resurrect their queen by draining the blood from unsuspecting civilians into her body.

Production
Prior to producing the film, Ed Adlum had a minor hit novelty song with his band The Castle Kings and worked as an editor for Cashbox magazine. Adlum's first entry into film production was for Blonde on a Bum Trip which he co-produced with Jack Bravman.  In the offices of Cashbox magazine, Adlum began developing the script for Invasion of the Blood Farmers with his co-worker Ed Kelleher. 

In the film's original script the blood farmers were going to be aliens from outer space. Within the first week of shooting, Adlum stated that they would not have enough money to have any outer space content in the film and had it changed to being about druids instead of aliens. Adlum has stated the cast primarily stuck to the script, with the exception of Dick Erickson (playing Kinski) who couldn't remember his lines and would need to use cue cards.

The film was shot primarily on weekends using Adlum's own house in Westchester County and woods north of New York City.

Release
After trying to sell the film to distributors, Adlum eventually met with Nick Demetroules who Adlum stated he did not have good relations with. Newspapers advertising articles to promote the film were released as early as June 7, 1972 in Burlington, Vermont.

Adlum spoke about home video releases of the film in 2012 stating he "never sold VCR or DVD rights to anybody. Every single copy is a knock off. And what's funny about those knock offs, is they all begin with an FBI disclaimer. It's like counterfeiting money and then putting on there, "Counterfeiting money will put you in jail.""

The film was released on Blu-Ray by Severin in 2019.

References

Sources

External links
 

1972 films
1972 horror films
Films shot in New York (state)
Folk horror films
American splatter films
Films about cults
1970s American films